Gillett High School may refer to:

 Gillett High School (Arkansas), Gillet, Arkansas
 Gillett High School (Wisconsin), Gillett, Wisconsin